Émile Pouget (12 October 1860 in Pont-de-Salars, Aveyron, now Lozère – 21 July 1931 Palaiseau, Essonne) was a French anarcho-communist, who adopted tactics close to those of anarcho-syndicalism. He was vice-secretary of the General Confederation of Labour from 1901 to 1908.

Footnotes

Works

 Almanach du Père Peinard, Paris, 1894 
 Almanach du Père Peinard, Paris, 1896 
 Almanach du Père Peinard, Paris, 1897 
 Almanach du Père Peinard, Paris, 1898 
 Comment nous ferons la Révolution, in collaboration with Émile Pataud, Paris, J. Taillandier, 1909
 L'action directe, Nancy, Édition du "Réveil ouvrier", coll. « Bibliothèque de documentation syndicale » 
 La Confédération générale du travail, Bibliothèque du Mouvement Prolétarien, Librairie des sciences politiques et sociales Marcel Rivière, Paris, 1910 
 Le Parti du Travail
 Le Sabotage, Mille et une nuits, coll. « La petite collection », Paris, 2004
 Les Caractères de l'action directe
 Les lois scélérates de 1893-1894, en collaboration avec Francis de Pressensé, Paris, Éditions de la "Revue blanche", 1899

Articles
 Barbarie française, Le Père Peinard, n°45, 12 janvier 1890
 Faramineuse consultation sur l'avenir, Almanach du Père Peinard, Paris, 1896
 Jabotage entre bibi et un fiston, Almanach du Père Peinard, Paris, 1894
 L'Automne, Almanach du Père Peinard, 1896
 L'été, Almanach du Père Peinard, 1897
 L'Hiver, Almanach du Père Peinard, 1897
 Le Muselage Universel, Almanach du Père Peinard, 1896
 Le Printemps, Almanach du Père Peinard, 1897
 Le Sabotage, Almanach du Père Peinard, Paris, 1898
 Les Lois Scélérates de 1893-1894, Éditions de la Revue blanche, 1899
 Patron assassin, Le Père Peinard, 4 juin 1893
 Pourquoi et comment Le Père Peinard s'est bombardé Journaleux, Almanach du Père Peinard, 1894
 Qu'on châtre la frocaille ! En attendant mieux, Le Monde libertaire, 31 janvier 2002
 Un cochon, Le Père Peinard, 10 août 1890

Bibliography
 Roger Langlais, Émile Pouget, Le Père Peinard, Éditions Galilée, 1976
 François Bott, « Le Père Peinard, ce drôle de Sioux », Le Monde, 30 janvier 1976.
 Dominique Grisoni, « Le Père Peinard de la révolution », Le Magazine Littéraire, n°111, avril 1976, 42-43.
 Emmanuel de Waresquiel, Le Siècle rebelle, dictionnaire de la contestation au XXe siècle, Larousse, coll. « In Extenso », 1999. 
 Xose Ulla Quiben, Émile Pouget, la plume rouge et noire du Père Peinard, Éditions Libertaires, 2006.
 Emile Pouget, Le Père Peinard, Journal espatrouillant. Articles choisis (1889–1900). Les Nuits rouges, 2006 .

References
 Dominique Sommier, Émile Pouget et Le Père Peinard, Almanach et hebdomadaire anarchiste (1889-1902), sur 19e.org, 2004.
 Lucien Orsane, À la mémoire d'Emile Pouget, Anarchiste syndicaliste révolutionnaire aveyronnais 1860-1931, sur Jccabanel.free.fr.
 Paco, La Plume rouge et noire du « Père Peinard », sur Monde-libertaire.info, 2006. 
 Paul Delesalle, Émile Pouget, Histoire du syndicalisme révolutionnaire et de l'anarcho-syndicalisme, sur Pelloutier.net.

External links

 Émile Pouget Archive at marxists.org
 fondation-besnard.org
 Editions CNT-RP
 ERREURS ET BRUTALITÉS COLONIALES (1927)
 "Emile Pouget: a biography" by Renée Lamberet

1860 births
1931 deaths
People from Aveyron
French anarchists
Members of the General Confederation of Labour (France)
Anarcho-communists